The Gauss Speaker Company later known as Cetec Gauss was an American company that made loudspeakers, in  Sun Valley, California. Gauss speakers were approved by Fender Musical Instruments Corporation and found widespread use among rock musicians of the 1960s thru the 1990s. The company is notable for its technical improvements in driver design, which include the use of a double spider. The former factory of Cetec Gauss was taken over by SWR_Sound_Corporation

References

Manufacturing companies of the United States